The Our Lady of Good Voyage Cathedral, also known as the Belo Horizonte Cathedral, is a Catholic cathedral in Belo Horizonte, Brazil.

History 

Since 1709, the site where the Cathedral of Our Lady of Good Voyage is now located was occupied by Catholic buildings. In colonial times, the "king's building" was destroyed for the construction of Belo Horizonte. Later on, a chapel with adobe walls was built in that location, which was replaced years later by a larger structure known as the Good Voyage church. On December 12, 1897, the Good Voyage church was destroyed.

Construction on the current church began in 1913, with the church built in the neo-Gothic style. On February 11, 1921, before the work was finished, the church was transformed into a cathedral by the Archdiocese of Belo Horizonte. The church was officially inaugurated in 1923. In 1924 it became archbishopric.

The church was consecrated to Our Lady of Good Voyage, the patron saint of Portuguese navigators. A statue of this saint was brought along by the establisher of the original church across the Atlantic, and has continued to be maintained over the years. The statue resides at the right side corner of the cathedral's altar and measures a little more than half a meter. Nowadays the church is kept and administrated by the Congregation of the Blessed Sacrament.

See also 
List of cathedrals in Brazil
Roman Catholicism in Brazil

References

Roman Catholic churches in Belo Horizonte
Gothic Revival church buildings in Brazil
Roman Catholic cathedrals in Minas Gerais
Roman Catholic churches completed in 1932
20th-century Roman Catholic church buildings in Brazil